The 2022 Interwetten European Darts Matchplay was the ninth of thirteen PDC European Tour events on the 2022 PDC Pro Tour. The tournament took place at the Trier Arena, Trier, Germany, from 1–3 July 2022. It featured a field of 48 players and £140,000 in prize money, with £25,000 going to the winner.

Joe Cullen was the defending champion after defeating Michael van Gerwen 8–5 in the 2019 final, but he lost to Ian White in the second round.

Luke Humphries won his fourth European Tour title of 2022, beating first-time finalist Rowby-John Rodriguez 8–7 in the final. It was also the third consecutive European Tour event that he attended that he won the title, as he withdrew from the Dutch Darts Championship.

Prize money
The prize money was unchanged from the European Tours of the last 3 years:

 Seeded players who lose in the second round and host nation qualifiers (who qualify automatically as a result of their ranking) who lose in their first match of the event shall not be credited with prize money on any Order of Merit. A player who qualifies as a qualifier, but later becomes a seed due to the withdrawal of one or more other players shall be credited with their prize money on all Orders of Merit regardless of how far they progress in the event.

Qualification and format
The top 16 entrants from the PDC ProTour Order of Merit on 30 April automatically qualified for the event and were seeded in the second round.

The remaining 32 places went to players from six qualifying events – 24 from the Tour Card Holder Qualifier (held on 9 May), two from the Associate Member Qualifier (held on 23 April), the two highest ProTour ranking German players, two from the Host Nation Qualifier (held on 23 April), one from the Nordic & Baltic Associate Member Qualifier (held on 20 February), and one from the East European Associate Member Qualifier (held on 24 April).

Michael van Gerwen, Peter Wright and Michael Smith, who were set to be the second, third and tenth seeds respectively, withdrew prior to the draw. Chris Dobey, Stephen Bunting and Daryl Gurney were promoted into seeded places, and three players were given first-round byes.

The following players took part in the tournament:

Top 16
   (second round)
  (second round)
  (champion)
  (second round)
  (quarter-finals)
  (second round)
  (quarter-finals)
  (quarter-finals)
  (second round)
  (third round)
  (second round)
  (second round)
  (second round)
  (second round)
  (semi-finals)
  (second round)

Tour Card Qualifier
  (quarter-finals)
  (first round)
  (third round)
  (first round)
  (first round)
  (runner-up)
  (second round)
  (second round)
  (first round)
  (first round)
  (first round)
  (second round)
  (first round)
  (first round)
  (first round)
  (semi-finals)
  (third round)
  (third round)
  (second round)
  (first round)
  (first round)

Associate Member Qualifier
  (third round)
  (third round)

Highest Ranked Germans
  (third round)
  (second round)

Host Nation Qualifier
  (third round)
  (first round)

Nordic & Baltic Qualifier
  (first round)

East European Qualifier
  (second round)

Draw

Notes

References

2022 PDC Pro Tour
2022 PDC European Tour
2022 in German sport
July 2022 sports events in Germany